Easy Does It is the second studio album by American country music singer Jake Owen. It was released on February 24, 2009, by RCA Records Nashville. It includes the Top 10 hits "Don't Think I Can't Love You" and "Eight Second Ride." As with his first album, Easy Does It is produced by Jimmy Ritchey, with whom Owen co-wrote several of the songs. It has sold 120,000 copies as of November 2009.

Content
Owen co-wrote eight of the ten songs on the album. Among the co-writes are the lead-off single "Don't Think I Can't Love You", which became his highest-charting single with a peak of number 2 on the Billboard Hot Country Songs chart on April 21, 2009. "Eight Second Ride", the album's second single, is a re-recording of a song from Owen's 2006 debut album Startin' with Me. "Tell Me" was the album's third single.

Track listing

Personnel
Kenny Aronoff - drums
Skip Cleavinger - bagpipes on "Nothin' Grows in Shadows"
Eric Darken - percussion
Paul Franklin - steel guitar, lap steel guitar, dobro
David Grissom - electric guitar
Tania Hancheroff - background vocals
Wes Hightower - background vocals
Mark Hill - bass guitar
Tim Lauer - keyboards
B. James Lowry - acoustic guitar
Brent Mason - electric guitar
Gordon Mote - keyboards
Jake Owen - lead vocals
Jimmy Ritchey - acoustic guitar, electric guitar
Glenn Worf - bass guitar

Chart performance

Weekly charts

Year-end charts

References

2009 albums
RCA Records albums
Jake Owen albums
Albums produced by Jimmy Ritchey